Christian Wulff (21 February 1777 – 17 March 1843) was a Danish naval officer.  He commanded  on her expedition to South America in 1840–41.

He was the younger brother of Peter Frederik Wulff, who headed the Royal Danish Naval Academy from 1724 to 1841, and was the owner of Petersgaard at Vordingborg.

Early life
Wulff was born on 21 February 1777 in Copenhagen, the son of first lieutenant and later commandant Frederik Christian Wulff (1749–1812) and Kirstine Wulff née Johansen (1755–1829).

Career
Wulff enrolled as a voluntary cadet in 1781 and became a cadet in 1792.  He reached the rank of second lieutenant in 1796.  Over the following years he visited the Mediterranean Sea several times, first onboard HDMS Triton (1797–99) and, after a short spell in 1800 in home waters on the training ship HDMS Fridericksværn, on HDMS Seieren (1800–01 and 1802).  He became a first lieutenant in 1802 and served as second-in-command on the brig FDMS Nidelven.

 In 1804–13, he was stationed as enrollment officer in Nakskov. In 1806, he served on HDNS Prinds Christian Frederik. He commanded the "Skærbåd" Nakskov and acted as divisionschef in the Second Battle of Copenhagen, September – October 1807.  In 1808–10, he was commander of the gun boats at Lolland. In 1808 he captured the Royal Navy brig , whose captain, Lieutenant John Watson Skinner, was killed during the engagement.  In 1809, his fleet of gun boats was in combat with the frigate  at Omø.  He attacked a large British convoy at Langeland in 1810. 

He reached the rank of captain-lieutenant (kaptajnsløjtnant) in 1810 and was sent to France in 1811 where he initially served on the Scheldt.  In 1811–12, he was second-in-command on the ship of the line Albanais.  He was freed from service in France in 1812 and traveled to Aachen  to recuperate.

Back in Denmark in 1814, he was once again commander of the gun boats at Tårs.  He was promoted to captain in 1815.

In 1825–26, he was commander of the corvette Diana on an expedition to the Danish West Indies.  He reached the rank of commanding captain in 1828 and commander in 1836.

The Danish frigate collided with a French chasse-marée, La sainte Fleur, which sank in the English Channel. The French captain was later given full responsibility for the incident.

Wulff negotiated with the government in Buenos Aires, the President of the Republic of Chile, and the government of Peru on behalf of the Danish government. 

On his return to Denmark in 1841, Wulff was appointed chamberlain and commander of the 1st division.  In 1742, he was appointed generaladjudant and jagtkaptajn.  He reached the rank of rearadmiral in 1842.

Personal life
Wulff married Henriette Bodille Birgitte Munthe af Morgenstierne (6 December 1782 – 16 March 1863) on 20 November 1803 in Aarhus.  She was the daughter of landowner and later county governor (amtmand) and chamberlain Caspar Wilhelm von Munthe af Morgenstierne (1744–1811) and Anna Petra Cathrine Flindt (1750–1814).  His wife bore him one daughter, Charlotte Louise Werner Wulff (1810–1842).

He owned Petersgaard in Vordingborg from 1810 to 1837.  He was a member of Roskilde stænderforsamling in 1835–36, elected by estate owners (sædegårdsejerne).

References

External links

 Christian Wulff
 Christian Wulff at geni.com

Other sources
 T. A. Topsøe-Jensen og Emil Marquard (1935) “Officerer i den dansk-norske Søetat 1660-1814 og den danske Søetat 1814-1932“. Two volumes.

19th-century Danish naval officers
Royal Danish Navy counter admirals
Royal Danish Naval Academy alumni
Danish military personnel of the Napoleonic Wars
1777 births
1843 deaths